WRMV-LP (94.5 FM) is a Positive Country formatted broadcast radio station licensed to Madison Heights, Virginia and serving Lynchburg, Virginia.  WRMV-LP is owned and operated by Fellowship Community Church and Christian Schools.

References

External links
 Cross Country 94.5 FM Online
 

RMV-LP
Radio stations established in 2003
RMV-LP
Country radio stations in the United States